Rayn Smid (born 26 March 1992 in Cape Town) is a South African rugby union player, who plays for Ealing. His regular position is number eight or flanker.

Career

Youth and Varsity Cup rugby

He represented  at various youth competitions. In 2008, he played for their Under-16 side at the Grant Khomo Week tournament; in 2009, he played for their Under-18 side at the Academy Week tournament and in 2010, he played for the Under-18s at the Craven Week tournament. He played for the  side in the 2011 Under-19 Provincial Championship competition and for the  side in the Under-21 Provincial Championship in 2012 and 2013, helping them to winning the competition in 2013 as vice-captain of the side.

Western Province

He was first included in the  senior side for the 2013 Vodacom Cup competition. His first class debut came in their opening match of the season against near neighbours .

His first appearance in the Currie Cup came a few months later, during the 2013 Currie Cup competition. He started the match against  following a late injury to Rynhardt Elstadt, which was his only appearance in the competition.

He was also included in the  wider training squad for the 2014 Super Rugby season.

At the end of 2014, Smid joined Italian side I Cavalieri on a short-term deal. He made two appearances for them in the 2014–2015 National Championship of Excellence and one in the 2015 Trophy of Excellence before returning to Cape Town prior to the 2015 Vodacom Cup competition.

Bristol Rugby

On 24 September 2015, English RFU Championship side Bristol announced that Smid would join them for the 2015–16 season. He made eight appearances for them during the 2015–16 season, but made just a single appearance for them in 2016–17, before leaving the club by mutual consent at the end of 2016.

Ealing Trailfinders

In January 2017 Smid joined the RFU Championship side Ealing Trailfinders, where he currently plays. Smid has enjoyed great success with the Trailfinders, appearing in almost every match since joining in 2017, frequently as captain. He was named to The Rugby Paper's Championship Dream Team for the 2018/19 season after scoring 11 tries.

References

South African rugby union players
Living people
1992 births
Sportspeople from Cape Town
Alumni of Rondebosch Boys' High School
Western Province (rugby union) players
Bristol Bears players
Rugby union flankers